James "Barry" Waldrep (born November 18, 1962) is an American Bluegrass, Jam Band, Americana instrumentalist, songwriter, composer and record producer.     Main instrument is acoustic guitar, but also plays electric guitar, mandolin and banjo.  

Waldrep co-founded the bluegrass/jam band Rollin' in the Hay in July 1993.  The band was based in Birmingham, Alabama, and formed as a side project. Waldrep was also a full time member of the Birmingham band Telluride. Rollin' In The Hay soon became a full-time band touring the Jam Band circuit of festivals and college campuses across the country until May 2009.  The band produced 7 CDs and performed over 300 dates per year for 16 years.

During this time, Waldrep recorded 21 bluegrass tribute albums with CMH Records in Los Angeles for Eric Clapton, The Black Crowes, Widespread Panic, Phish, R.E.M., Tim McGraw, The Allman Brothers, Neil Diamond and others.  He was also featured on the CD Masterworks of American Bluegrass also produced by CMH Records.  At this point, Waldrep started recording solo records and doing tours & studio sessions with other artists.

September 2009,   Zac Brown invited Waldrep to join him on his "Breaking Southern Ground Tour".   Waldrep is featured on the Zac Brown Band Pass The Jar CD/DVD, along with Kid Rock and Little Big Town. During this time he met the husband and wife country duo Joey + Rory. He did a tour with them during the Zac Brown Tour, and in some cases, they all toured together. In addition, Waldrep played the Grand Ole' Opry several times and the Ryman Auditorium in Nashville, Tennessee, which was the previous home of the Grand Ole' Opry.

In January 2013, after landing a record deal with Singular Records in San Francisco, California, Waldrep began the Smoke From the Kitchen sessions, which is a bluegrass banjo/southern rock project.  This project includes artists Chuck Leavell (Rolling Stones), Paul T. Riddle (Marshall Tucker Band), Oteil Burbridge (Allman Brothers), Charlie Starr (Blackberry Smoke), Coy Bowles (Zac Brown Band), Benji Shanks and Jazz Grass Mandolin player David "Dawg" Grisman.

In January 2016 Barry teamed up with singer songwriter Kelli Johnson to spend the year touring as a duo. During this year they released one CD "Hey Country (where are you now).

October 2016, Barry announces he will be touring with Country Artist John Berry as a member of his band on Johns 2016 Christmas tour.

January 2017, Barry Waldrep and friends began performing their fusion of Bluegrass/Southern Rock with special guest vocalists. The band is Barry (Electric and Acoustic Guitar, Mandolin & Banjo), Jason Bailey (Mandolin), Caelan Berry (Drums) & Bryan Hall (Upright Bass). Guest vocalists include Jimmy Hall (Wet Willie, Jeff Beck, Hank Williams Jr), Donna Hall & Joe Debrow.

2018, Barry continues with  his own band, and their shows have been called by fans as a "SOUTHERN CULTURE REVIVAL".  Waldrep states that this branding is the result of just being who we are.  "No matter what we play it's gonna sound southern".

He and his band mates are all natives of Georgia or Alabama and have musical influences from Bluegrass, Jazz, Southern Rock and Gospel.

2019 - 2022, Barry is spending a lot of time in the studio recording for other artists.  In addition he produced and recorded a tribute to the late guitarist Tony Rice which was recorded at the Nutthouse in Muscle Shoals, Alabama called Barry Waldrep & Friends Celebrate Tony Rice. (Released December 2021)  Barry states that this is his favorite place to record. 

The artists included on this project are Vince Gill, Radney Foster, Warren Haynes, Rodney Crowell, Mike Farris, Larry Campbell, Teresa Williams, John Berry, Jimmy Hall, Kelli Johnson, Donna Hall, Jacob Bunton, Darrell Scott, Patrick Simmons, John Paul White, Rory Feek, John Cowan, Kim Richey, John Jorgenson, Marty Raybon, Jim Lauderdale, Emmylou Harris, Tammy Rogers, Aubrey Haynie, Oteil Burbridge, Jason Bailey, Bryn Davies, Heidi Feek, Dillon Hodges, James "Hutch" Hutchinson, Spooner Oldham, Scott Vestal, Benji Shanks, Andrea Zonn. 

 Early years 
Barry Waldrep (Son of James & Barbara Waldrep) grew up in Randolph County Alabama.  James was a professional auto mechanic, and a part-time bluegrass musician.  Barbara worked in the manufacturing industry.  The family vacations were most every weekend as they performed on the southeastern bluegrass festival circuit.

Barry graduated from Randolph County High School - Wedowee, Alabama in 1982.  After a short term at Jacksonville State University, he moved to Auburn, Alabama to start classes at Auburn University, but started a band instead.  With several day jobs in the middle of all the club shows, he decided to make music a full-time job in 1988.  His first stint at being a full-time musician started with a 3-month house gig at a beach club in Panama City Beach, Florida.  Barry Was used to performing on the bluegrass festival circuit with his fathers band where people attended events to hear the music.  The club owner in Panama City, wanted a band to make people dance and drink, so the summer gig only lasted a week.  Determined to succeed, Waldrep hit all the clubs and landed another gig.  The band quickly revamped the set list, and made it through the summer.

The next 5 years were filled with road side honky tonks & college bar gigs with various bands until 1993 when he started Rollin' In The Hay.

 Personal life 
Spouses

Julie Russell (1986 - 1987), Rhona Leavitt (1996 - 2007), Lesia Williams (2014–Present)

Children

Mallorie McGue (Step Daughter), Morgan McGue (Step Daughter)

Banjo.com
In addition to touring,  Barry purchased the 12 year old musical instrument company banjo.com in May 2015.

Smoke from the Kitchen lineup
The lineup on Smoke from the Kitchen'' includes:

Banjo, Mandolin & Acoustic Guitar: Barry Waldrep,
Bass: Oteil Burbridge (Allman Brothers Band),
Drums: Paul Riddle (The Marshall Tucker Band),
Hammond: Coy Bowles (The Zac Brown Band),
Electric Guitar, Acoustic Guitar: Charlie Starr (Blackberry Smoke),
Electric Guitar, Resonator Guitar: Benji Shanks (Captain Soularcat/Last Waltz Ensemble),
Mandolin: David Grisman (Jerry Garcia, Peter Rowan),
Keyboards: Chuck Leavell (Allman Brothers Band and Rolling Stones),
Vocals: Paris Luna, Aaron Trubic (Sean Costello Band)

Toured and/or recorded with
Zac Brown Band -
Randy Travis -
Joey & Rory -
Jimmy Hall -
John Cowan -
John Berry -
Darrell Scott -
Rodney Crowell -
Marty Raybon -
Mike Farris -
Kim Richey -
Warren Haynes -
Oteil Burbridge -
Charlie Starr -
Chuck Leavell -
David Grisman -
Vince Gill -
Radney Foster -
Teresa Williams -
Larry Campbell -
Jim Lauderdale -
Patrick Simmons -
John Paul White -
John Jorgenson -
Rory Feek -
Donna Hall -
Emmylou Harris -
Tammy Rogers -
Spooner Oldham -
Andrea Zonn -
Dillon Hodges -
Kelli Johnson -
Scott Vestal -
Aubrey Haynie -
Caelan Berry -
Bryan Hall -
Jason Bailey -
Bryn Davies -
Benji Shanks,
James "Hutch" Hutchinson -
Heidi Feek - 
Jacob Bunton -
Paul T. Riddle -
Coy Bowles -
Paris Luna -
Sol Junky -
Kurt Thomas -
Nic Cowan AKA Nico Moon -
Sonia Leigh -
Levi Lowry -
Sarah Peacock -
Lynam -
Wayne Mills Band -
Caddle -
Rock Killough -
Brandon Perry -
Andrea Frankle

Concert Promoting
Barry has hosted and promoted many festivals and concerts in the Alabama and Georgia region. Acts include John Berry, Jimmy Hall, The Kentucky Headhunters, Confederate Railroad, Wet Willie, The Marshall Tucker Band, Flatt Lonesome, Sarah Peacock and many others.

Overview
 Origin: Randolph County Alabama
 Genres: Bluegrass, Jam Band, Americana, Southern Rock
 Years Active: 1969 – Present
 Labels: CMH Records, Singular Records, Delta Grass Records
 Associated Acts: Zac Brown Band, Allman Brothers Band, Marshall Tucker Band, Blackberry Smoke, Joey & Rory, Randy Travis

Discography

Bluegrass Tributes

 Widespread Panic / 1998
 Phish / 1998
 The Allman Brothers Band / 1998
 REM / 1998
 String Cheese Incident / 1999
 Black Crowes / 1998
 Eric Clapton / 1999
 Neil Diamond / 1999
 Tim McGraw / 1998
 Travis Tritt / 1999
 Alan Jackson / 1999
 Jo Dee Messina / 2000
 Lee Ann Womack / 2000
 Brooks & Dunn / 2000
 Master Works of American Bluegrass / 2000

Barry Waldrep Projects

 Barry Waldrep / Steel Rails / 1997
 Barry Waldrep / The Muscle Sholes Sessions / 2002
 Barry Waldrep / Acoustic Stew / 2007
 Barry Waldrep / Band of Brothers & Sisters / 2011
 Barry Waldrep & Jacob Bunton / Six Ways Til Sunday / 2005
 Barry Waldrep / Smoke From The Kitchen / 2014

Rollin' In The Hay

 Rollin' In The Hay / Badass Bluegrass / 1993
 Rollin' In The Hay / Live At Oasis / 1994
 Rollin' In The Hay / Renegade Bluegrass / 1996
 Rollin' In The Hay / Self Titled / 1998
 Rollin' In The Hay / Live At Oasis 2 / 1999
 Rollin' In The Hay / Live At The Flora-Bama / 2000
 Rollin' In The Hay / Live At The War Eagle Supper Club / 2000
 Rollin' In The Hay / Tribute to Brother Cane / 2002

Guest Appearances

 Paris Luna / Between The Ditches / 2011
 Sol Junky / Dead & Gone / 2011
 Kurt Thomas / Front Porch Swing / 2010
 Nic Cowan / Cheap Wine / 2010
 Sonia Leigh / 1978 December / 2011
 Levi Lowery / Self Titled / 2010
 Chris Scott / Hard Livin' / 2003
 Sarah Peacock / Live / 2011
 Sarah Peacock / Albuquerque Sky / 2012
 Lynam / Bling Bling / 2001
 Wayne Mills Band / Bad Man / 2002
 Donna Hall / It's Never Too Late / 2002
 Caddle / Raise'em High / 2008
 Sol Junky / Dead & Gone / 2011
 Rock Killough / Impressions/ 1996
 Runaway Coal Train / Self Titled / 2008
 Jason Bailey / Southwood / 2003
 Andrea Frankle / Self Titled / 1998
 Brandon Perry / Shades of Gray / 2010
 Zac Brown Band / Pass the Jar / 2009
 Randy Travis / 25th Anniversary Celebration / 2011
 Joey & Rory / Album #2 / 2010
 Breaking Southern Ground / 2010

References
  
 Smoke From the Kitchen. Retrieved May 3, 2014.
 Telluride. Retrieved May 6, 2014.
 Music City Roots Photo Gallery. Retrieved May 6, 2014.
 Zac Brown Band Breaking Southern Ground Tour Photo Gallery. Retrieved May 6, 2014.
 Smoke From The Kitchen VIP CD Release Concert at Red Clay Theatre. Retrieved May 13, 2014.

External links
 

Musical groups from Georgia (U.S. state)
Living people
Year of birth missing (living people)